Alasdair Neil Morgan (born 21 April 1945) is a former Scottish National Party (SNP) politician. He was Depute Leader of the SNP from 1990–91 and served in the British House of Commons as the Member of Parliament for Galloway and Upper Nithsdale from 1997–2001. He was elected in 1999 as a Member of the Scottish Parliament (MSP) for Galloway and Upper Nithsdale. From 2003–2011, he served as a member for the South of Scotland region.

Morgan was a Deputy Presiding Officer of the Scottish Parliament from 2007–2011. He was an Electoral Commissioner from 2014-2022.

Early life and career
Morgan was born in Aberfeldy and was educated at Breadalbane Academy and the University of Glasgow, graduating in 1968 with a MA Honours degree in Mathematics and Political economy. From 1971–74 he worked as a Teacher of Mathematics at Linlithgow Academy and subsequently Douglas Ewart High School. He graduated from the Open University with a Bachelor of Arts degree in 1990.

He was employed as a Software Programmer at Shell from 1974–80, then as a Systems Analyst with General Electric from 1980–84. He then worked as a Computer Systems Team Leader at Fife Regional Council (1984–1986), Lothian Regional Council (1986–1996) and West Lothian Council (1996–1997).

Political career
Morgan joined the Scottish National Party in 1974. He served as SNP National Treasurer from 1983–90, when he was elected Senior Vice Convener (depute leader) at the same election that saw Alex Salmond first elected as Leader of the Scottish National Party. Morgan was defeated by Jim Sillars in the depute leadership election the following year, but served as National Secretary from 1992–97. During that same year, he was elected as one of the SNP's vice presidents; an office he held until these positions were abolished as part of the party's constitutional reforms in 2004.

He was the SNP candidate for the Tayside North constituency in 1983, Dundee West in 1987 and Dumfries in 1992.

Morgan was elected as the Member of Parliament for Galloway and Upper Nithsdale at the 1997 general election and served as a member of the Trade and Industry Select Committee and as leader of the SNP parliamentary group in the House of Commons from 1999–2001. Morgan stepped down at the 2001 general election.

He was elected as the Member of the Scottish Parliament (MSP) for Galloway and Upper Nithsdale in 1999, with a majority of 3,201 votes. He served as convener of the Justice and Home Affairs Committee from 2000–01. At the 2003 Scottish Parliamentary election, he narrowly lost his constituency seat to Alex Fergusson of the Scottish Conservative Party by just 99 votes. However, he was elected as a List MSP for the South of Scotland region. In 2007, he was re-elected by the regional list.

Morgan served as convener of the Enterprise and Culture Committee from 2003–04, convener of the SNP parliamentary group from 2003–05, and as SNP chief whip from 2005–07. Morgan was a Deputy Presiding Officer of the Scottish Parliament from 2007–11. He retired as an MSP at the 2011 Scottish Parliamentary election. In May 2014, he was appointed as an Electoral Commissioner and served until Sep 2022.

Personal life
Morgan is married with two daughters. He lives in Dunfermline, Fife.

References

External links 
 
 Profile at the Electoral Commission
 They Work For You

|

1945 births
Living people
Members of the Parliament of the United Kingdom for Scottish constituencies
Members of the Scottish Parliament 1999–2003
Scottish National Party MPs
Scottish National Party MSPs
UK MPs 1997–2001
Alumni of the University of Glasgow
Alumni of the Open University
British computer programmers
People from Perth and Kinross
Members of the Scottish Parliament 2003–2007
Members of the Scottish Parliament 2007–2011
Deputy Presiding Officers of the Scottish Parliament